Annunciation is a bronze relief of the Annunciation by Alessandro Vittoria, created c. 1583. It is now in the Art Institute of Chicago. Produced using the lost wax method, it was commissioned by Hans Fugger for his family chapel at Schloss Kirchheim in Swabia. It remained in the Fugger family collection until 1908 and was bought by its present owner in 1942.

References

1580s sculptures
Sculptures of the Art Institute of Chicago
Vittoria